Leo E. Strine, Jr. (born 1964) is an American attorney and retired judge for the state of Delaware. He served on the Delaware Court of Chancery as vice chancellor from 1998 to 2011 and chancellor from 2011 to 2014, and as the chief justice of the Delaware Supreme Court from 2014 to 2019. Strine has worked in private practice since 2020.

Life and career
Born in Baltimore, Strine grew up in Hockessin, Delaware. He graduated from A.I. DuPont High School in 1982. Strine then graduated magna cum laude from the University of Pennsylvania Law School in 1988 with his Juris Doctor, after having received his Bachelor of Arts summa cum laude from the University of Delaware in 1985.

Strine clerked for Judge Walter K. Stapleton of the United States Court of Appeals for the Third Circuit and for Chief Judge John F. Gerry of the United States District Court for the District of New Jersey. He was a corporate litigator at the firm of Skadden, Arps, Slate, Meagher & Flom, and then Counsel to Governor Thomas R. Carper.

Strine has taught at several academic institutions including UCLA School of Law, University of Pennsylvania Law School, Vanderbilt University Law School, and Harvard Law School, and lectured at many more. He is currently the Michael L. Wachter Distinguished Fellow in Law and Policy at the University of Pennsylvania Law School. He became Vice Chancellor of the Delaware Court of Chancery on November 9, 1998, and became Chancellor of that court on June 22, 2011. During the 2006–2007 academic year, he served as a special judicial consultant to the American Bar Association's Committee on Corporate Laws. Strine was confirmed as Chief Justice of the Delaware Supreme Court on January 29, 2014.

In October 2018, Strine wrote for the majority when it found that the business judgment rule protected a controlling shareholder even though it did not offer minority shareholder protections until after its initial squeeze-out bid.

In July 2019, Strine announced his retirement from the bench, to be carried out at the end of September or October or upon the confirmation of his successor. Strine retired from active service on October 30, 2019.

In April 2020, the New York-based law firm, Wachtell Lipton announced that former Chief Justice Strine would be joining its firm to advise Wachtell’s clients on mergers, litigation and other matters. He is currently Of Counsel in the firm's storied Corporate department.

In July 2022, Twitter announced it had retained Wachtell Lipton to sue Elon Musk in regards to the termination of Twitter's acquisition by Musk. Strine was announced as part of the team handling the matter

Personal life
Strine lives in Hockessin, Delaware, with his wife Carrie, an occupational therapist, and their two sons, James and Benjamin.

Controversy
The Supreme Court of Delaware admonished Strine in 2012 for an opinion he wrote while serving on the Delaware Court of Chancery. The opinion included discussion of legal issues about limited liability companies unrelated to the case at hand. He also made comments about the litigants' fashion, referred to the case as a "drunken WASP fest," and asked them to disclose their religion.

In a 2010 case, Ingres Corp. v. CA Inc., during a breach of contract case, both sides, Ingres Corp and CA Inc, both agreed that Strine erred. Vice Chancellor Strine made a comment that he, "forgot this oral statement and delved only into the voluminous record. As indicated above, this record was confusing and I came away from it with the wrong impression. …I overlooked this deposition testimony and instead focused upon the written documents in the record when drafting the Post-Trial Opinion. In short, I blew it.” Yet, he maintained that his "original factual finding to the contrary was inaccurate," and after admitting how his error impacted his previous determination, he decided the error does not materially change the outcome of the case.

Publications
Strine has published many academic articles on corporate law and is a frequent commenter on business law, generally. Notably, he has been published by the Yale Law Journal, Harvard Law Review, University of Pennsylvania Law Review, Cornell Law Review, Northwestern Law Review, Delaware Journal of Corporate Law, and the Journal of Corporation Law. Many of his scholarly writings can be found on his SSRN page.

See also
Delaware Court of Chancery
Supreme Court of Delaware
US corporate law

References

External links
Judicial Officers - Supreme Court - Delaware Courts - State of Delaware

1964 births
21st-century American judges
Corporate lawyers
Chief Justices of Delaware
Justices of the Delaware Supreme Court
Harvard Law School faculty
Henry Crown Fellows
Lawyers from Baltimore
Living people
People from Hockessin, Delaware
Place of birth missing (living people)
Skadden, Arps, Slate, Meagher & Flom people
University of Delaware alumni
University of Pennsylvania faculty
University of Pennsylvania Law School faculty
University of Pennsylvania Law School alumni
Vanderbilt University alumni
Chancellors of Delaware
Vice Chancellors of Delaware